Didier Tayou (born 31 December 1988) is a Cameroonian footballer, who plays for Victoria Hotspurs F.C. in the Maltese Gozo League First Division as a forward.

Career
Born in Douala, he began his career with Podium Douala in 1995. In 2001, he moved to Togo, where he joined Kakadel de Defale.  In 2002, he moved to Benin, where he joined Mogas 90 FC, and became the Benin Premier League vice-champion, winning the Benin Cup in 2003.  He played with Mogas in the CAF Confederation Cup 2004, where they were eliminated in the first round. He joined another Beninese club, Energie Cotonou, having played with them in the 2005–06 season. In 2007, he moved to the Ivory Coast, where he played with AS Denguélé during the first half of 2007, and then with Stade d'Abidjan during the second half. At the end of 2007, he moved to his third Côte d'Ivoire Premier Division club, Stella Club d'Adjamé, playing with them the first half of the 2008 season.

In the summer of 2008, he moved to Tunisia and signed with Olympique du Kef. The club was playing in the Tunisian second tier, but this ended up playing in Tayou's favour; he immediately made an impact and became the club's best scorer with 10 goals in the 2008–09 season and, in the following one, he became the second best top scorer of the 2009–10 Tunisian Ligue Professionnelle 2 with 12 goals. This good exhibition made him join Najran SC on loan, and he played in the Saudi Premier League between summer and winter 2011. In December 2011, he moved to Europe for the first time, joining FK Sloboda Užice, a mid-table Serbian SuperLiga side. On 20 September 2013, he signed with Mqabba playing in the Maltese First Division.

In the summer of 2014, he joined Finnish Ykkönen side AC Oulu. Then, in January 2015, he moved to Malta and joined Victoria Hotspurs F.C.

References

External sources
 Didier Tayou at Srbijafudbal

1988 births
Living people
Footballers from Douala
Cameroonian footballers
Cameroonian expatriate footballers
Association football forwards
Expatriate footballers in Togo
Expatriate footballers in Benin
AS Denguélé players
Stade d'Abidjan players
Stella Club d'Adjamé players
Expatriate footballers in Ivory Coast
Expatriate footballers in Tunisia
Najran SC players
Expatriate footballers in Saudi Arabia
FK Sloboda Užice players
Serbian SuperLiga players
Expatriate footballers in Serbia
Mqabba F.C. players
Victoria Hotspurs F.C. players
Expatriate footballers in Malta
AC Oulu players
Expatriate footballers in Finland
Energie FC players
Saudi Professional League players
Mogas 90 FC players
Olympique du Kef players
Cameroonian expatriate sportspeople in  Togo
Cameroonian expatriate sportspeople in Benin
Cameroonian expatriate sportspeople in Saudi Arabia
Cameroonian expatriate sportspeople in Tunisia
Cameroonian expatriate sportspeople in Malta
Cameroonian expatriate sportspeople in Finland